"Cyr" and "The Colour of Love" are songs by the American alternative rock band The Smashing Pumpkins, released as a double-A side single from their eleventh studio album, Cyr. A music video was produced for "Cyr".

Background and recording
"Cyr" and "The Colour of Love" were recorded in Chicago and produced by frontman Billy Corgan.

Music videos
A black and white music video was directed, edited, and colored by Linda Strawberry. She has described the music video as “a goth fever dream of pent up emotion – an artistic visual release attempting to create a momentary escape from the emotional black cloud hanging over all of us this year. A dark seduction filmed in quarantine at a social distance.”

Critical reception
Both songs generally received positive reviews. Consequence of Sound described “Cyr” as "a dance anthem that sounds like Adore meets ABBA", while they described “The Colour of Love” as an "all the midnight anthems within 2000’s Machina". They also added that both tracks "hearken back to Billy Corgan’s salad days, back when he worshipped The Cure on FM radio".

Track listing

Personnel
The Smashing Pumpkins
 Jimmy Chamberlin – drums
 Billy Corgan – vocals, guitar, bass, keyboards, production
 James Iha – guitar
 Jeff Schroeder – guitar

Additional personnel
 Katie Cole – background vocal
 Sierra Swan – background vocal

Charts

References

External links 
 
 

The Smashing Pumpkins songs
2020 singles
Sumerian Records singles
Songs written by Billy Corgan
Songs written by James Iha
Song recordings produced by Billy Corgan
Black-and-white music videos